Hugo Raes (26 May 1929 – 23 September 2013) was a Belgian writer and poet.

Bibliography
 Jagen en gejaagd worden (1954)
 Afro-europees (1957)
 Links van de helikopterlijn (1957)
 De vadsige koningen (1961)
 Een tijdelijk monument (1962)
 Hemel en dier (1964)
 Een faun met kille horentjes (1966)
 Bankroet van een charmeur (1967)
 De lotgevallen (1968)
 Reizigers in de anti-tijd (1970)
 Explosie (1972)
 Het smaran (1973)
 De Vlaamse Reus (1974)
 Brandstichting tegen de tijd (1976)
 Trapezenwerk in het luchtledige (1976)
 De verwoesting van Hyperion (1978)
 Verzamelde verhalen (1979)
 Het jarenspel (1981)
 De goudwaterbron (1986)
 De Gektewind (1988)
 De strik (1988)
 De Spaanse sjaal (1989)
 Verhalen (1998)
 Een aquarel van de tijd (2001)

See also

 Flemish literature

References

Sources
 Hugo Raes
 G.J. van Bork en P.J. Verkruijsse, De Nederlandse en Vlaamse auteurs (1985)
 Fernand Auwera, Hugo Raes In: Schrijven of schieten. Interviews (1969)

1929 births
Flemish poets
2013 deaths
20th-century Belgian poets